The list of ship launches in 1863 includes a chronological list of some ships launched in 1863.

{| class="wikitable sortable" style="font-size:1.00em; line-height:1.5em;"
!style="text-align: left;"|Date
!style="text-align: left;"|Country
!style="text-align: left;"|Builder
!style="text-align: left;"|Location
!style="text-align: left;"|Ship
!style="text-align: left;"|Class and type
!style="text-align: left;"|Notes
|-----
| 10 January
| 
| 
| Keyport, New Jersey
| 
| Ram
|
|-----
| 13 January
| 
| F Z Tucker
| Brooklyn, New York
| 
|
|
|-----
| 13 January
| 
| Union Iron Works
| Carondelet, Missouri
| 
| Monitor
|
|-----
| 17 January
| 
| Reaney, Son, & Archibold
| Chester, Pennsylvania
| 
| 
|
|-----
| 21 January
| 
| Harland & Wolff
| Belfast
| 
| Cargo ship
| For J. Bibby & Sons.
|-----
| 17 February
| 
| New York Navy Yard
| New York
| 
|
|
|-----
| 18 February
| 
| George C Bester
| Peoria, Illinois
| 
| Monitor
|
|-----
| 18 February
| 
| Union Iron Works
| Carondelet, Missouri
| 
| Monitor
|
|-----
| February
| 
| J J Abrahams
| Baltimore, Maryland
| 
|
|
|-----
| February
| 
| 
| Boston, Massachusetts
| 
|
|
|-----
| February
| 
| H D Bassett
| Selma, Alabama
| 
| Ironclad Ram
|
|-----
| 4 March
| 
| Paul Curtis
| Boston, Massachusetts
| 
|
|
|-----
| 7 March
| 
| Thomas Stack
| Brooklyn, New York
| 
|
|
|-----
| 8 March
| 
| Curtis & Tilden
| Boston, Massachusetts
| 
|
|
|-----
| 17 March
| 
| New York Navy Yard
| New York
| 
|
|
|-----
| 19 March
| 
| Portsmouth Navy Yard
| Kittery, Maine
| 
|  Monitor
|
|-----
| 19 March
| 
| J Simonson
| Greenpoint, New York
| 
|
|
|-----
| 19 March
| 
| Devonport Dockyard
| Devonport
| 
| 
|
|-----
| 23 March
| 
| Boston Navy Yard
| Charlestown, Massachusetts
| 
| 
|
|-----
| 31 March
| 
| J A & D D Westerveldt
| New York
| 
|
|
|-----
| 3 April
| 
| H A Jones
| Cincinnati, Ohio
| 
|
|
|-----
| 4 April
| 
| G W Jackson
| Newburyport, Massachusetts
| 
| Gunboat
|
|-----
| 7 April
| 
| Harland & Wolff
| Belfast
| 
| Sailingship
| For T. & J. Brocklebank.
|-----
| 16 April
| 
| Charles Brun
| Rochefort
| Plongeur
| Submarine
| First mechanically propelled submarine
|-----
| 17 April
| 
| Portsmouth Navy Yard
| Kittery, Maine
| 
| Gunboat
|
|-----
| 21 April
| 
| G W Lawrence
| Portland, Maine
| 
| Gunboat
|
|-----
| 22 April
| 
| 
| New York
| 
|
|
|-----
| 6 May
| 
| Cowper Phipps Coles
| Glasgow
| 
| Ironclad
| Denmark's first ironclad warship
|-----
| 7 May
| 
| Philadelphia Navy Yard
| Philadelphia, Pennsylvania
| 
|
|
|-----
| 9 May
|  British Columbia
| James Trahey
| Alexandria
| 
|
|
|-----
| 12 May
| 
| William Cramp & Sons
| Philadelphia Navy Yard
| 
| Gunboat
|
|-----
| 29 May
| 
| Curtis & Tilden
| Boston, Massachusetts
| 
| Gunboat
|
|-----
| 4 June
| 
| Boston Navy Yard
| Boston, Massachusetts
| 
|
|
|-----
| 15 June
| 
| Portsmouth Navy Yard
| Kittery, Maine
| 
| Gunboat
|
|-----
| 19 June
| 
| Harland & Wolff
| Belfast
| 
| Sailing ship
| For J. P. Corry & Co.
|-----
| 29 June
| 
| William Graves
| Richmond, Virginia
| 
| Ironclad ram
|
|-----
| 30 June
| 
| H F Willink
| Savannah, Georgia
| 
| Ironclad
|
|-----
| June
| 
| Samuda Brothers
| Poplar
| 
| Troopship
|
|-----
| 2 July
| 
| Ishikawajima
| Tokyo
| 
| Gunboat
|
|-----
| 3 July
| 
| New York Navy Yard
| New York
| 
| Gunboat
|
|-----
| 4 July
| 
| Union Iron Works
| St. Louis, Missouri
| 
| Monitor
|
|-----
| 4 July
| 
| Laird, Son & Co
| Birkenhead
| 
| Ironclad
|
|-----
| 29 July
| 
| Continental Iron Works
| Greenpoint, New York
| 
|
|
|-----
| 30 July
| 
| Boston Navy Yard
| Boston, Massachusetts
| 
|
|
|-----
| July
| 
| Hunley, McClintock, and Watson
| Mobile, Alabama
| 
| Submarine
|
|-----
| July
| 
|
| East Albany, New York
| Mary Cook
|
|
|-----
| 1 August
| 
| Harrison Loring
| Boston, Massachusetts
| 
| 
| Lead ship of her class
|-----
| 6 August
| 
| D S Mainthon
| Bordentown, New Jersey
| 
|
|
|-----
| 12 August
| 
| Reany, Son, and Archibold
| Chester, Pennsylvania
| 
|
|
|-----
| 15 August
| 
| New York Navy Yard
| Brooklyn, New York
| 
|  monitor
|
|-----
| 15 August
| 
| Pembroke Dockyard
| Pembroke
| 
| Sloop
|
|-----
| 15 August
| 
| Harland & Wolff
| Belfast
| 
| Sailing ship
| For Joshua Prouse & Co.
|-----
| 24 August
| 
| Neafie and Levy
| Philadelphia, Pennsylvania
| 
|
|
|-----
| 28 August
| 
| Boston Navy Yard
| Boston, Massachusetts
| 
| Gunboat
|
|-----
| 29 August
| 
| Laird, Son & Co
| Birkenhead
| 
| Ironclad
|
|-----
| August
| 
| 
| Glasgow
| Sea King
|
|
|-----
| 12 September
| 
| Secor and Company
| Jersey City, New Jersey
| 
| Monitor
|
|-----
! 20 September
| 
| Laing
| Sunderland
| 
| Steamship
| For private owner.
|-----
| 29 September
| 
| Philadelphia Navy Yard
| Philadelphia, Pennsylvania
| 
| Gunboat
|
|-----
| 29 September
| 
| Harland & Wolff
| Belfast
| 
| Barque
| For Larrinaga Steamship Co.
|-----
| September
| 
|
|
| Vicksburg
| Tugboat
|
|-----
| 3 October
| 
| Pembroke Dockyard
| Pembroke
| 
| Royal yacht
|
|-----
| 7 October
| 
| Harland & Wolff
| Belfast
| 
| Tug
| For Lower Bann Steamboat Co.
|-----
| 13 October
| 
| Harland & Wolff
| Belfast
| 
| Barque
| For W. H. Tindall.
|-----
| 14 October
| 
| Perine, Secor & Co.
| New York
| 
| Monitor
|
|-----
| 14 October
| 
| Thames Ironworks
| Leamouth
| 
| 
|
|-----
| 19 October
| 
| Taşkızak Shipyard
| Golden Horn
| 
| Frigate
|
|-----
| 20 October
| 
| New York Navy Yard
| New York
| 
|
|
|-----
| October
| 
| Berry & Brothers
| Wilmington, North Carolina
| 
| Ironclad gunboat
|
|-----
| October
| 
| Harland & Wolff
| Belfast
| 
| Cargo ship
| For J. Ritchie & Co.
|-----
| 11 November
| 
| 
| Rochefort
| | 
| For French Navy
|-----
| 13 November
| 
| 
| West Brownsville, Pennsylvania
| J T Stockdale|
|
|-----
| 14 November
| 
| Gibson, McDonald & Arnols
| Ramsey
| Euterpe| Windjammer
| for Wakefield Nash & Company
|-----
| 12 December
| 
| Thames Ironworks and Shipbuilding Company
| Leamouth
| | 
|
|-----
| 16 December
| 
| Harlan & Hollingsworth
| Wilmington, Delaware
| | Monitor
| 
|-----
| 21 December
| 
| New York Navy Yard
| New York
| | Gunboat
|
|-----
| 23 December
| 
| Chatham Dockyard
| Chatham
| | Broadside ironclad
|
|-----
| 29 December
| 
| Delamater Iron Works
| New York
| | Monitor
|
|-----
| Unknown date
| 
| S H Pook
| Fair Haven, Connecticut
| Admiral|
|
|-----
| Unknown date
| 
| Neafie and Levy
| Philadelphia, Pennsylvania
| Ajax|
|
|-----
| *nknown date
| 
|
| 
| Albert de Groat| Tugboat
|
|-----
| Unknown date
| 
| Lewis Hagland
| New Brunswick, New Jersey
| Alfred A Wotkyns|
|
|-----
| Unknown date
| 
|
| Cincinnati, Ohio
| |
|
|-----
| Unknown date
| 
|
| Renfrew
| |
|
|-----
| Uunknown date
| 
|
|
| |
| For Norddeutscher Lloyd
|-----
| Unknown date
| 
|
| Monongahela, Pennsylvania
| |
|
|-----
| Unknown date
| 
|
| Monongahela, Pennsylvania
| Argosy No.2|
|
|-----
| Unknown date
| 
|
| Mystic, Connecticut
| |
|
|-----
| Unknown date
| 
| New Albany, Indiana
| |
|
|-----
| Unknown date
| 
|
| Cincinnati, Ohio
| Banker|
|
|-----
| Unknown date
| 
| 
| Metropolis, Illinois
| |
|
|-----
| Unknown date
| 
|
| Cincinnati, Ohio
| Ben Gaylord|
|
|-----
| Unknown date
| 
| 
| Cleveland, Ohio
| | Tugboat
|
|-----
| Unknown date
| 
| 
| New Orleans, Louisiana
| |
|
|-----
| Unknown date
| 
|
| 
| |
|
|-----
| Unknown date
| 
| T Stoney
| Charleston, South Carolina
| | Torpedo boat
|
|-----
| Unknown date
| 
|
| Cincinnati, Ohio
| Emma Brown|
|
|-----
| Unknown date
| 
| 
| Cincinnati, Ohio
| Fanny Barker|
|
|-----
| Unknown date
| 
|
| Cincinnati, Ohio
| Florence Miller II|
|
|-----
| Unknown date
| 
| S H Pook
| Fair Haven, Connecticut
| |
|
|-----
| Unknown date
| 
|
| Richmond, Virginia
| |
|
|-----
| Unknown date
| 
| 
| Philadelphia, Pennsylvania
| Fred Wheeler|
|
|-----
| Unknown date
| 
| Fincourt
| New York
| | Tugboat
|
|-----
| Unknown date
| 
| 
| Monongahela, Pennsylvania
| |
|
|-----
| Unknown date
| 
| 
| Savannah, Georgia
| | Floating battery
|
|-----
| Unknown date
| 
| 
| Greenock
| |
|
|-----
| Unknown date
| 
| Reany, Archibald & Sons
| Philadelphia, Pennsylvania
| Glide| Tugboat
|
|-----
| Unknown date
| 
| Van Deusen Bros
| New York
| |
| For the Neptune Steamship Company
|-----
| Unknown date
| 
| 
| Murraysville, Virginia
| | Gunboat
|
|-----
| Unknown date
| 
| 
| Cincinnati, Ohio
| Hartford
|
|
|-----
| Unknown date
| 
| 
| Portland, Maine
| |
|
|-----
| Unknown date
| 
| 
| Philadelphia, Pennsylvania
| Innes| Tugboat
|
|-----
| Unknown date
| 
| 
| Gloucester, New Jersey
| J E Bazely| Tugboat
|
|-----
| Unknown date
| 
| 
| Newburgh
| John A Dix|
|
|-----
| Unknown date
| 
| 
| New Brunswick, New Jersey
| John T Jenkins| Tugboat
|
|-----
| Unknown date
| 
| 
| Philadelphia, Pennsylvania
| | Tugboat
|
|-----
| Unknown date
| 
| 
| River Clyde
| |
|
|-----
| Unknown date
| 
|
| Philadelphia, Pennsylvania
| Luke Hoyt
| Tugboat
|
|-----
| Unknown date
| 
| 
| Philadelphia, Pennsylvania
| |
|
|-----
| Unknown date
| 
| 
| Cleveland, Ohio
| Mary Grandy| Tugboat
|
|-----
| Unknown date
| 
|
| Newburgh, New York
| Meteor|
|
|-----
| Unknown date
| 
| 
| Montgomery, Alabama
| | Ironclad
|
|-----
| Unknown date
| 
| 
| Cincinnati, Ohio
| |
|
|-----
| Unknown date
| 
|
|
| | Cutter
|
|-----
| Unknown date
| 
| New York Navy Yard
| New York
| |
|
|-----
| Unknown date
| 
| 
| Belle Vernon, Pennsylvania
| |
|
|-----
| Unknown date
| 
| 
| Cincinnati, Ohio
| |
|
|-----
| Unknown date
| 
| 
| Harmer, Ohio
| Ohio Valley|
|
|-----
| Unknown date
| 
| 
| Brooklyn, New York
| Peter B Van Houten|
|
|-----
| Unknown date
|  New South Wales
| Australian Steam Navigation Company
| Sydney
| | Gunboat
| for the New Zealand Colonial Government
|-----
| Unknown date
| 
| 
| Brooklyn, New York
| Polar Star|
|
|-----
| Unknown date
| 
| 
| Wilmington, Delaware
| Pontiac|
|
|-----
| Unknown date
| 
| 
| Freedom, Pennsylvania
| Princess|
|
|-----
| Unknown date
| 
| 
| Cincinnati, Ohio
| Rachel Miller|
|
|-----
| Unknown date
| 
|
| Philadelphia, Pennsylvania
| R F Loper| Tugboat and Torpedo boat
|
|-----
| Unknown date
| 
| 
| Cincinnati, Ohio
| |
|
|-----
| Unknown date
| 
| 
| Haddam, Connecticut
| Sarah S B Gary|
|
|-----
| Unknown date
| 
| 
| Cincinnati, Ohio
| Scioto|
|
|-----
| Unknown date
| 
| 
| East Haddam, Connecticut
| Signal|
|
|-----
| Unknown date
| 
| Robert Steele
| Greenock
| | Clipper
|
|-----
| Unknown date
| 
|
| Cincinnati, Ohio
| |
|
|-----
| Unknown date
| 
| 
| Philadelphia, Pennsylvania
| Tonawanda|
|
|-----
| Unknown date
| 
|
| 
| | 
|
|-----
| Unknown date
| 
| 
| Brooklyn, New York
| Willett Rowe|
|
|-----
| Unknown date
| 
|
| 
| | 
|
|-----
| Unknown date
| 
| 
| Newburgh, New York
| Zouave| Tugboat
|
|-----
| Unknown date
| 
| 
| Richmond, Maine
| '''
| Full-rigged ship
| Wrecked at Liverpool in 1875
|}

References 

Sources

1863
Ship launches